South Dakota Highway 42 (SD 42) is a segmented state highway in southeastern South Dakota, United States. The first segment is a  highway in Aurora County. The final segment connects Sioux Falls to Iowa Highway 9 southeast of Rowena.

Route description
The westernmost segment of SD 42 begins at a junction with U.S. Route 281 (US 281) and travels east through open farmland.

The central segment of the highway begins at an intersection with SD 37 in rural Davison County. It heads east and crosses the BNSF Railway. Just east of the railroad, the route passes through the town of Ethan, then enters Hanson County. About  farther east, SD 42 bends slightly to the south and crosses the James River. The highway continues east through the flat prairie and enters McCook County.

Here, it curves to the northeast and crosses another branch of the BNSF Railway before meeting the eastern terminus of SD 262. SD 42 then curves back to the east and leaves Bridgewater. It continues through flat farmland, intersecting US 81 and passing over the west fork of the Vermillion River. The route heads east about  before crossing the east fork of the Vermillion River, and then entering Minnehaha County.

In Minnehaha County, SD 42 intersects SD 19, and the two highways run east for about  before SD 19 splits off to the north, and SD 42 continues east toward Sioux Falls. The central segment of SD 42 ends at Ellis Road near the Sioux Falls city limits.

The easternmost segment of SD 42 begins at Six Mile Road east of the city of Sioux Falls. It runs southeast, concurrent with SD 11 along Arrowhead Parkway. The two highways pass by a golf course and a park before crossing the Big Sioux River. East of the river, SD 11 turns to the north toward Brandon, and SD 42 curves to the east. The highway passes through the unincorporated community of Rowena before curving due south and crossing the Iowa state line. The route continues into Iowa as Iowa Highway 9.

Major intersections

See also

 List of state highways in South Dakota

References

External links

042
Transportation in Sioux Falls, South Dakota
Transportation in Aurora County, South Dakota
Transportation in Davison County, South Dakota
Transportation in Hanson County, South Dakota
Transportation in McCook County, South Dakota